Helene Pellicano (born 17 April 2002) is a Maltese female junior tennis player.

Career 
Pellicano has a career high WTA singles ranking of 710, achieved on 18 March 2019.

Playing for Malta in the Fed Cup, she has win–loss record of 5–1.

On 18 March 2019, Pellicano became Malta's highest ever ranked women's singles player.

References

External links

2002 births
Living people
Maltese female tennis players